Imperial City Wall Relics Park (also translated as Huangchenggen Relics Park and Imperial Palace Wall Relics Park) is a garden near Forbidden City and Wangfujing in Beijing, China.

References

Gardens in Beijing